Vario may refer to:

People 
 Paul Vario (1914–1988), high-ranking member of the Lucchese crime family
 João Vário (1937–2007), Cape Verdean writer, neurosurgeon, scientist, and professor
 Akhtar Ali Vario (died 2008), politician

Technology 
 MDA Vario, a version of the HTC Wizard smartphone
 Vario (Pokémon), a Pokémon Colosseum character
 Variometer, an aircraft flight instrument sometimes shortened to "vario"

Other uses 
 Mercedes-Benz Vario, a heavy van
 Vario (Savant album), an album by Savant